The Fourbees Cavite Patriots Total Attackers are a professional men's volleyball team playing in various tournaments, including the Philippine Super Liga (PSL) and the Spikers' Turf. The team debuted in the PSL 2014 Grand Prix Conference. The team is owned by Fourbees.

Previous roster

Spikers' Turf
For the Spikers' Turf 2015 First Conference:

Coaching staff
 Head Coach: Sinfronio Acaylar
 Assistant Coach(s): Sandy Rieta

Team Staff
 Team Manager: Ernest Camarillo
 Team Utility: 

Medical Staff
 Team Physician: 
 Physical Therapist:

Philippine Superliga
For the 2014 PSL Grand Prix Conference:

Coaching staff
 Head Coach: Jason Sapin
 Assistant Coach(s): Sandy Rieta Tito Monzon

Team Staff
 Team Manager: Tito Monzon
 Team Utility: 

Medical Staff
 Team Physician: Ernest Camarillo
 Physical Therapist: Renante Remorca

Honors

Team

Spikers' Turf

Philippine Super Liga

Individual
Philippine Super Liga:

Team captains
  Edgardo Rusit (2014)

References

External links
 PSL-Cavite Patriots Fourbees Page

Philippine Super Liga
Spikers' Turf
2014 establishments in the Philippines
Volleyball clubs established in 2014
Sports in Cavite